Dylan Ouédraogo (born 22 July 1998) is a professional footballer who plays as a defender for Belgian First Division B club OH Leuven. Born in France, he represents the Burkina Faso national football team.

Club career
A youth product of Monaco, Ouédraogo signed with the Cypriot club Apollon Limassol on 4 August 2018.

International career
Ouédraogo was born in France and is of Burkinabé descent. He debuted for the Burkina Faso national team in a 2–0 friendly loss to Morocco on 24 March 2017.

References

External links
 
 Ouedraogo Monaco Profile
 

1998 births
Living people
Footballers from Marseille
Citizens of Burkina Faso through descent
Burkinabé footballers
Burkina Faso international footballers
French footballers
French sportspeople of Burkinabé descent
Sportspeople of Burkinabé descent
Association football defenders
Apollon Limassol FC players
AS Monaco FC players
Oud-Heverlee Leuven players
Cypriot First Division players
Ligue 1 players
Belgian Pro League players
Challenger Pro League players
French expatriate sportspeople in Belgium
French expatriate sportspeople in Monaco
French expatriate sportspeople in Cyprus
Burkinabé expatriate sportspeople in Belgium
Burkinabé expatriate sportspeople in Monaco
Burkinabé expatriate sportspeople in Cyprus
Expatriate footballers in Belgium
Expatriate footballers in Monaco
Expatriate footballers in Cyprus
21st-century Burkinabé people